The Aetoloacarnania Football Clubs Association (AFCA) (Ένωση Ποδοσφαιρικών Σωματείων Αιτωλοακαρνανίας, ΕΠΣΑΙΤΩΛ = Enosi Podosfairikon Somateion Aetoloacarnanias, EPSAITOL) is a football (soccer) organization in the Aetolia-Acarnania region that is part of the Greek Football Federation.

It was founded in 1968 and its main headquarters are in the city of Messolonghi.

External links
 Official website 

Aetolia-Acarnania
Association football governing bodies in Greece